FC Yevpatoria is an association football team based in Yevpatoria, Crimea.

Honours

Crimean Premier League (1st Tier)
  2017–18, 2019–20
  2016–17, 2020–21
CFU Cup (National Cup)
  2016–17
  2019–20, 2020–21

League and cup history (Crimea)
{|class="wikitable"
|-bgcolor="#efefef"
! Season
! Div.
! Pos.
! Pl.
! W
! D
! L
! GS
! GA
! P
!Domestic Cup
!colspan=2|Europe
!Notes
|-
|align=center|2015
|align=center|1st All-Crimean Championship Gr. B
|align=center|10/10
|align=center|9
|align=center|0
|align=center|0
|align=center|9
|align=center|8
|align=center|43
|align=center|0
|align=center|
|align=center|
|align=center|
|align=center bgcolor=brick|Reorganization of competitions
|-
|align=center|2015–16
|align=center|1st Premier League
|align=center|4/8
|align=center|28
|align=center|12
|align=center|4
|align=center|12
|align=center|42
|align=center|35
|align=center|40
|align=center bgcolor=tan| finals
|align=center|
|align=center|
|align=center|
|-
|align=center|2016–17
|align=center|1st Premier League
|align=center bgcolor=tan|3/8
|align=center|28
|align=center|15
|align=center|3
|align=center|10
|align=center|64
|align=center|36
|align=center|48
|align=center bgcolor=gold|Winner
|align=center|
|align=center|
|align=center|
|-
|align=center|2017–18
|align=center|1st Premier League
|align=center bgcolor=gold|1/8
|align=center|28
|align=center|21
|align=center|4
|align=center|3
|align=center|72
|align=center|19
|align=center|67
|align=center bgcolor=tan| finals
|align=center|
|align=center|
|align=center|
|-
|align=center|2018–19
|align=center|1st Premier League
|align=center|5/8
|align=center|28
|align=center|10
|align=center|6
|align=center|12
|align=center|46
|align=center|44
|align=center|36
|align=center| finals
|align=center|
|align=center|
|align=center|
|-
|align=center|2019–20
|align=center|1st Premier League
|align=center bgcolor=gold|1/8
|align=center|28
|align=center|21
|align=center|4
|align=center|3
|align=center|54
|align=center|23
|align=center|67
|align=center bgcolor=silver|Runners-up
|align=center|
|align=center|
|align=center|
|-
|align=center|2020–21
|align=center|1st Premier League
|align=center bgcolor=tan|3/8
|align=center|28
|align=center|14
|align=center|2
|align=center|12
|align=center|48
|align=center|33
|align=center|44
|align=center bgcolor=silver|Runners-up
|align=center|
|align=center|
|align=center|
|-
|align=center|2021–22
|align=center|1st Premier League
|align=center|
|align=center|
|align=center|
|align=center|
|align=center|
|align=center|
|align=center|
|align=center|
|align=center|
|align=center|
|align=center|
|align=center|
|-
|}

References

External links
Official website 

 
Football clubs in Crimea
Association football clubs established in 2015
2015 establishments in Russia
FC